Sorbung is a recently discovered Sino-Tibetan language spoken in Manipur, northeastern India. Although the speakers are ethnically Tangkhul, it appears to be a non-Tangkhulic Kuki-Chin language, as it shows strong links with what was called 'Southern Tangkhul' in Brown (1837), which was also a non-Tangkhulic language spoke by ethnic Tangkhul.

Sorbung is spoken by about 300 people of Sorbung village, Ukhrul District, Manipur, northeastern India. Sorbung speakers consider themselves to be ethnic Tangkhul. A language that is unambiguously Tangkhulic is spoken in nearby Tusom village. Kuki (Thadou) and Maring are also spoken in neighboring villages.

See also
Southern Luhupa language

References

Kuki-Chin languages
Tangkhulic languages